The Men's C-2 1000m event at the 2010 South American Games was held over March 27 at 10:20.

Medalists

Results

References
Final

1000m C-2 Men